Orthilia is a genus of flowering plants in the family Ericaceae. It has only one species, Orthilia secunda. Its common names are sidebells wintergreen, one-sided-wintergreen and serrated-wintergreen. It is also called one-sided pyrola, one-sided shinleaf, and one-sided wintergreen.  It was previously part of genus Pyrola, the wintergreens.

The plant has a circumboreal distribution, growing throughout much of the Northern Hemisphere.

The American wintergreen, Gaultheria procumbens, belongs to a different genus.

Mixotrophy
Orthilia secunda is a mixotroph.  It obtains about one half of its carbon from mycorrhizal networks.  Mycorrhizal fungi obtain carbon through the roots of nearby trees.  Orthilia then obtains the carbon from the fungi through its roots.  No counterflow of nutrients has been observed.

Conservation status within the United States
It is listed as endangered and extirpated in Maryland, extirpated in Indiana, presumed extirpated in Ohio, as threatened in Iowa and Rhode Island. It is a special concern and believed extirpated in Connecticut.

Ethnobotany
The Southern Carrier  of the Central Interior of British Columbia, Canada use a strong decoction of the root as an eyewash. Some Native Americans also crushed the leaves to make a poultice.

References

External links
 
 Jepson Manual Treatment
 Photo gallery

Pyroloideae
Monotypic Ericaceae genera
Flora of Europe
Flora of North America
Flora of temperate Asia
Plants used in traditional Native American medicine